Avia Brener (born January 24, 1994) is an Israeli female acrobatic gymnast. With partners May Miller and Shoval Sofer, Brener competed at the 2014 Acrobatic Gymnastics World Championships, at the 2015 European Games, and at the 2016 Acrobatic Gymnastics World Championships.

References

1994 births
Living people
Israeli acrobatic gymnasts
Female acrobatic gymnasts
Place of birth missing (living people)